Brad Church (born November 14, 1976) is a Canadian professional ice hockey executive and former player.  As a forward, Church played two games for the Washington Capitals  and ten years of professional hockey in the minor leagues.  Chosen 17th overall by the Capitals in the 1995 NHL Entry Draft, Church spent most of his time in the minors.  After several years, the Capitals traded him in 1999 to the Edmonton Oilers, but he never made the parent club.

Church retired as a player following the 2005–06 season, and joined the Phoenix RoadRunners of the ECHL as an assistant coach.  With eight games remaining in the season, head coach Ron Filion announced his resignation, and Church became the team's head coach.  He led the club to their first ECHL playoff appearance, where they were swept by the Las Vegas Wranglers in four games.

Between 2014 and 2016, Church was chief operating officer for one of his former teams, the American Hockey League's Portland Pirates.

Career statistics

References

External links

1976 births
Living people
Canadian ice hockey forwards
Dauphin Kings players
Hamilton Bulldogs (AHL) players
National Hockey League first-round draft picks
Sportspeople from Dauphin, Manitoba
Portland Pirates players
Washington Capitals draft picks
Washington Capitals players
Ice hockey people from Manitoba